46th Regiment or 46th Infantry Regiment may refer to:

United Kingdom
 46th (South Devonshire) Regiment of Foot, a unit of the British Army 
 46th (Liverpool Welsh) Royal Tank Regiment, a unit of the British Army 
 46th Infantry Brigade (United Kingdom), a unit of the British Army

United States
 46th Infantry Regiment (United States), a unit of the United States Army

American Civil War regiments

Union (Northern) Army regiments
 46th Illinois Volunteer Infantry Regiment
 46th Iowa Volunteer Infantry Regiment
 46th Wisconsin Volunteer Infantry Regiment
 46th Indiana Infantry Regiment
 46th New York Volunteer Infantry
 46th Ohio Infantry
 46th United States Colored Infantry

Confederate (Southern) Army regiments
 46th North Carolina Infantry Regiment
 46th Virginia Infantry Regiment (Pendleton County, West Virginia), a Virginia State Unit
 46th Arkansas Infantry (Mounted)
 46th Virginia Infantry

See also
 46th Division (disambiguation)
 46th Brigade (disambiguation)
 46th Squadron (disambiguation)